Zintiridis is a surname. Notable people with the surname include:

Revazi Zintiridis (born 1985), Greek judoka
Tariel Zintiridis (born 1987), Greek judoka

Greek-language surnames